Franklinton High School may refer to:
Franklinton High School (Louisiana)
Franklinton High School (North Carolina)